Neal Hellman (born April 13, 1948 in New York, NY) is an American folk musician, music teacher, and performer of the mountain dulcimer. He has been active in performing, writing, teaching and recording acoustic music for the past thirty years throughout the United States and Europe.

In collaboration with Joe Weed, Neal wrote the score for Princess Furball, a children's video by Weston Woods which won a 1993 American Library Association Commendation. 	
An original composition, written by Neal and performed by Jay Ungar and Molly Mason, is featured on the Ken Burns production "The Story of Susan B Anthony and Elizabeth Cady Stanton" which was broadcast on PBS across the United States in the fall of 1999.

He is the author of a number of books on the Appalachian dulcimer, including It's A Dulcimer Life, The Dulcimer Chord Book, The Hal Leonard Dulcimer Method, Beatles Dulcimer Book and The Music of the Shakers For Mountain Dulcimer on Mel Bay Publications.

As founder, director and one of the primary artists of the Gourd Music record label, Neal has produced over thirty albums, including Simple Gifts, Tree of Life, The Fairie Round, Tender Shepherd, The World Turned Upside Down and A Victorian Christmas.

Discography
Oktober County (1988) - Gourd Music

Dream of the Manatee (with Joe Weed) (1989) - Gourd Music

Autumn in the Valley (1993) - Gourd Music

Emma's Waltz (2007) - Gourd Music

References

Bibliography
 Neal Walters & Brian Mansfield (ed.) (1998) MusicHound Folk: The Essential Album Guide, p. 358-359,  (the source of his birth date and place).

External links 
Podcast episode about Neal Hellman.
Oktober County - Artist's Biography.
FolkLib Index - Gourd Music discography

Living people
American male musicians
Appalachian dulcimer players
American folk musicians
1948 births